This is a list of funicular railways, organised by place within country and continent. The funiculars range from short urban lines to significant multi-section mountain railways.

A funicular railway is distinguished from the similar incline elevator in that it has two vehicles that counterbalance one another rather than independently operated cars.

Africa

South Africa

 Cape of Good Hope, Flying Dutchman Funicular (opened 1996)

Réunion
 Saint-Benoît, Takamaka funicular (opened 1968) industrial funicular for Takamaka hydroelectric power stations employees

Saint Helena
 Jamestown, Jacob's Ladder (1829–1871)

Americas

Brazil
 Niterói, Niterói funicular (1906- closed before 1950s) 
 Paranapiacaba, São Paulo Railway (two lines 1867–1982; now rack operated)
 Rio de Janeiro: 
Outeiro da Glória funicular (opened 1942; modernized 2003) 
Paula Mattos funicular (1877-1926) 
 Salvador:
 (opened 1889)
 (opened 1981)
 (opened 1915) replacing a rack railway from 1897
 Santos,  (opened 1927)

Canada

Alberta
 Edmonton:
 Edmonton Incline Railway (1908–1913)
 River Valley Funicular, opened 2017 (This is an inclined elevator, not a funicular)

Ontario
 Hamilton, Hamilton Incline Railway (1900–1936)
 Niagara Falls:
 Falls Incline Railway (also known as the Horseshoe Falls Incline) (1966–)
 Leander Colt Incline (circa 1869–1889)
 Maid of the Mist Incline (1894–1990; also known as the Clifton Incline)
 Whirlpool Rapids Incline (circa 1876–1934)

Quebec
 Montreal, Mount Royal Funicular Railway (1884–1918)
 Quebec City, Old Quebec Funicular (1879–1907) cable, (1907–1945) electric, rebuilt in 1946, in operation to this day. (This has been modified to operate as a pair of inclined elevators, it is no longer a funicular)

Chile

 Santiago
 Cerro San Cristóbal (opened 1925)
 Cerro Santa Lucía (opened 1902, closed 1910)
 Cerro 18 (opened 2016)
 Valparaíso (see also: Funicular railways of Valparaíso)
 Arrayán (opened 1905, closed 1964)
 Artillería (opened 1893)
 Barón (opened 1906)
 Bellavista (opened 1897, closed 1955)
 Concepción (opened 1883)
 Cordillera (opened 1887)
 El Hogar (opened 1912, closed 1955)
 El Peral (opened 1902)
 Esmeralda (opened 1905, closed 1962)
 Espíritu Santo (opened 1911)
 Florida (opened 1906)
 Hospital Carlos van Buren (opened 1929)
 La Cruz (opened 1908, closed 1992)
 Larrain (opened 1906)
 Las Monjas (opened 1912)
 Lecheros (opened 1906)
 Mariposas (opened 1904)
 Pantéon (opened 1900, closed 1952)
 Perdices (opened 1932, closed 1962)
 Placeres (opened 1913, closed 1971)
 Ramaditas (opened 1914, closed 1955)
 Reina Victoria (opened 1902)
 San Agustin (opened 1913)
 Sant Domingo (opened 1910, closed 1965)
 Villaseca (opened 1907)
 Viña del Mar
 Villanelo (opened 1983)

Colombia
 Bogotá, Monserrate (1929)

Mexico

Guanajuato
 Guanajuato City, Guanajuato funicular : inaugurated in 2001, it joins the theatre Juarez to the monument El Pipila.

Nuevo León
 Grutas de García (replaced by an aerial tramway)

Puerto Rico
 Fajardo, El Conquistador Resort funicular (This is a pair of independent inclined elevators, not a funicular)

United States

Alaska
 Ketchikan, Creek Street Funicular Tram (This is an inclined elevator, not a funicular)

Arkansas
 Marble Falls, Dogpatch USA, Dogpatch Funicular Tram (1971–1993)

California
 Dana Point, Strand Beach Funicular (2009–) (This is an inclined elevator, not a funicular)
 Fairfax (1913–1929)
 Feather River Canyon, Bucks Creek Powerhouse, single car incline used for inspection of water system, now abandoned.  Rails still visible on canyon walls.
 Industry, Pacific Palms Resort, Industry Hills Golf Club funicular (opened 1979; currently closed for maintenance)
 Los Angeles
 Angels Flight (opened 1901, closed 1969, moved and re-opened 1996, closed 2001, re-opened 2010, closed 2013, re-opened in 2017)
 Court Flight (closed), (operated from 1904 to 1943 damaged by fire; razed 1944), now site of Court of Flags.
 Mt. Washington Railway (1909–1919), Operated in the Highland Park/Mt. Washington neighborhood of L.A., ticket office and powerhouse still exist.
 Playa del Rey (1901–1909) Two cars ran in a counterbalance configuration from a Los Angeles Pacific Railway stop at the base of the Westchester cliffs to a hotel at the top of the bluff. Legend has it that the two cars were named 'Alphonse' and 'Gaston'.
 San Francisco
 Fillmore Counterbalance
 Telegraph Hill, funicular to the observatory at the summit operated on Greenwich Street between 1884 and 1886.
 Highpoint Terrace, a private funicular serving a complex on Geneva Avenue (This is an inclined elevator, not a funicular)
 The "Las Casitas Tram", a private funicular used to serve an apartment complex on Bay Street. (This is an inclined elevator, not a funicular)
 Santa Catalina Island, Island Mountain Railway (1904–1918; 1921–1923)
 Valencia, Six Flags Magic Mountain Honda Express, (original name: Funicular)

Colorado

 Cañon City, Royal Gorge, Royal Gorge Incline (1931–2013)
 Golden, Lookout Mountain (1912–1920)
 Golden, South Table Mountain (1912–1920)
 Manitou Springs, Manitou Incline (1907–1990)
 Morrison, Red Rocks Amphitheatre, Mount Morrison Cable Incline (1909–1914)

Iowa
 Dubuque
 Fourth Street Elevator (opened 1882; still operational)
 Eleventh Street Elevator (closed)

Massachusetts
 Hadley, Mount Holyoke Railroad (1854–1938)
 Holyoke, Mount Tom Railroad (1897–1938)

Michigan
 Kalamazoo, Western State Normal Railroad (1908–1949)

Minnesota
 Duluth
 7th Avenue West Incline Railway (1891–1939)
 Duluth Belt Line Railway (in West Duluth) (1889–1916)

Missouri
(opened 1957, still operational)

Nevada
 Mirage-Treasure Island Tram (This is a cable-pulled automated people mover, not a funicular)

New Jersey
 Hoboken, Hoboken Elevated Wagon Lift (1873–1949)
 Orange Orange Mountain Cable Railway (1893–1902)
 Weehawken
 Eldorado Elevator
 Weehawken Elevated Wagon Lift (opened 1873–closed)

New York

 Beacon, Mount Beacon Incline Railway (1902–1972; 1975–1978)
 Lake George, Prospect Mountain Cable Incline Railway (1895–1903)
 Niagara Falls, Prospect Park Incline Railway (1847–1907)
 Niagara Falls, Maid of the Mist Incline (1894–1990, reopened 2019) (this is in Ontario, not New York State)
 Palenville, Otis Elevating Railway (1892–1918)
 Sea Cliff, Sea Cliff Incline (1886–after 1907) 
 Yonkers
 Park Hill Incline (1894–1937) 
 Ridge Hill Incline, Yonkers other funicular to the Sprain Ridge Hospital Campus.

North Carolina
 Fontana Dam turbine hall access on the east side of the Little Tennessee River (technically not a funicular, but an inclined railway a single car with a balance sled which rolls on tracks underneath the cab).  No longer operational.
 Maggie Valley, Ghost Town in the Sky (opened 1961, closed 2002, park reopened 2007, incline still not operational)

Ohio
 Cincinnati
 Bellevue Incline (1876–1926)
 Fairview Incline (1892–1923)
 Mount Adams Incline (1874–1948)
 Mount Auburn Incline (1872–1898)
 Price Hill Incline (1874–1943)

Pennsylvania
 Altoona, Horseshoe Curve funicular (still operational)
 Ashley, Ashley Planes (1837–1948)
 Beaver Falls, Patterson Heights Incline (1895–1927)
 Johnstown, Johnstown Inclined Plane (opened 1891; still operational)
 Mauch Chunk Switchback Railway (1847–1938)
 Mount Jefferson Plane, Summit Hill
 Mount Pisgah Plane, Jim Thorpe
 Pittsburgh
 Bellevue Incline (1887–1892)
 Castle Shannon Incline (1890–1964)
 Castle Shannon South Incline (1892–c. 1914)
 Clifton Incline (1889–1905)
 Duquesne Incline (opened 1877; still operational)
 Fort Pitt Incline (1882–1900)
 H.B. Hays and Brothers Coal Railroad, inclines on Becks Run and Streets Run, operational in 1877
 Knoxville Incline (1890–1960)
 Monongahela Incline (opened 1870; still operational)
 Monongahela Freight Incline (1884–1935)
 Mount Oliver Incline (1872–1951)
 Norwood Incline (1901–1923)
 Nunnery Hill Incline (1888–1895)
 Penn Incline (1884–1953)
 Pittsburgh and Castle Shannon Plane (bef. 1871–c. 1912)
 St. Clair Incline (1888–c. 1932)
 Troy Hill Incline (1888–1898)
 West Elizabeth
 Walton's coal incline
 O'Neil and Company Incline

Tennessee
 Chattanooga, Lookout Mountain Incline Railway (opened 1895; still operational)

Utah

 Park City, The St. Regis Funicular (opened 2009; still operational).

Virginia
 Roanoke, Mill Mountain Incline (1910–1929)

Washington
 Seattle, Queen Anne Counterbalance (1901-1940)

Wisconsin
 Milwaukee, Villa Terrace Decorative Arts Museum (This is an inclined elevator, not a funicular)

Asia

East Asia

China
Anhui
 Huangshan funicular

Chongqing
 Yuzhong, Wanglongmen funicular (1945–1993)
 Yuzhong, Caiyuanba funicular (1953–1996)
 Yuzhong, Chaotianmen funicular (1983–2007) (2019 Planned reopening)

Jiangxi
 Jiujiang, Lushan – Sandiequan funicular

Shanxi
 Taiyuan, Ximingkuang Cable Car (西铭矿缆车)

Hong Kong

 Peak Tram
 Ocean Park, Ocean Express
 Po Fook Hill Elevator
 Discovery Bay Elevator

Japan

 
 Sotogahama, Seikan Tunnel Museum, Seikan Tunnel Tappi Shako Line
 
 Kitakyushu, Hobashira Cable
 
 Kawanishi, Nose Railway, Myoken Cable
 Kobe:
 Kobe City Urban Development, Maya Cablecar
 Rokko Maya Railway, Rokko Cable Line
 Skylator (Legally an elevator, not a funicular.)
 
 Tsukuba, Tsukuba Kanko Railway, Mt. Tsukuba Cable Car
 
 Takamatsu, Shikoku Cable, Yakuri Cable
 
 Hakone, Hakone Tozan Railway, Hakone Tozan Cable Car
 Isehara, Oyama Kanko Dentetsu, Oyama Cable Car
 
 Kyoto, Kyoto:
 Keifuku Electric Railroad, Eizan Cable
 Kurama-dera, Kurama-dera Cable
 Miyazu, Tango Kairiku Kotsu, Amanohashidate Cable Car
 Yawata, Keihan Electric Railway, Otokoyama Cable
 
 Ikoma, Kinki Nippon Railway, Ikoma Cable
 
 Beppu, Okamoto MFG, Beppu Rakutenchi Cable
 
 Yao, Kinki Nippon Railway, Nishi Shigi Cable
  Tokyo Metropolitan Prefecture
 Hachioji, Takao Tozan Electric Railway, Takao Tozan Cable
 Ome, Mitake Tozan Railway, Mitake Tozan Cable
 
 Tateyama:
 Tateyama Kurobe Kanko, Kurobe Cable Car
 Tateyama Kurobe Kanko, Tateyama Cable Car
 
 Otsu, Hieizan Railway, Sakamoto Cable
 
 Kannami, Izuhakone Railway, Jukkokutoge Cable Car
 
 Koya, Nankai Electric Railway, Koyasan Cable

North Korea 
 Paektu Mountain Funicular, Paektu Mountain

South Korea
 Samcheok,  Incline Train

Russia

(Russia is a transcontinental country spanning Europe and Asia. All the funicular railways below are on the East Asian side so are listed here.)

 Vladivostok,   (opened 1934)

South Asia

India 

 Joginder Nagar, Himachal Pradesh is India's highest funicular at 2530 metres (8300 feet) elevation above sea level. It was built in 1930s to carry heavy machinery of Shanan Power House to Barot. It is on one meter gauge. It is a 4-stage network of funicular and horizontal track and has six haulage car stations. The loading capacity of haulage way cars are 15, 10, 5 tons. Higher the capacity, lower the speed. Haulage Way Car or Trolley at Jogindernagar is one of a few funicular railways all over the globe and is considered as an engineering marvel of the 20th century.
 Bhira and Bhivpuri Road in the state of Maharashtra, the Tata Group operates funicular railways.
 Tamil Nadu, Palani Murugan temple, Palani Temple Funicular
 Saptashrungi, Maharashtra, inaugurated in 2018.

Southeast Asia

Indonesia
 Bali
 Ayana Resort and Spa Funicular
 Ubud Hanging Gardens

Malaysia

 Penang, Penang Hill, Penang Hill Railway (1923-2010 with 2 independent sections; re-opened in 2011 as a one-section funicular)

Philippines
 Tagaytay Highlands Funicular, Tagaytay, Cavite

Thailand
 Chiang Mai, Wat Phra That Doi Suthep
 Phetchaburi, Khao Wang
 Songkhla, Khao Tang Kuan

Vietnam
 Danang, Ba Na Hill

West Asia

Azerbaijan

 Baku, Baku Funicular (1960–late 1980s; re-opened 2001)

Georgia 

 Tbilisi, funicular to Mtatsminda Pantheon (1905-2000; re-opened 2013)

Israel

 Haifa, Carmelit (1959-1986; re-opened 1992)

Lebanon
 Harissa, Funiculaire de Harissa (opened 1965)

Turkey
The country of Turkey is in both Europe and Asia. The border between the two continents is the Bosphorus Strait. All the funicular railways in Turkey are on the European side of the Bosphorus Strait so they are listed under Europe.

Europe

Austria

 Bad Hofgastein,  (opened 1964, replaced by monocable gondola 2018)
 Ellmau,  (opened 1972, replaced by monocable gondola in 2015)
 Graz, Schlossbergbahn (opened 1894)
 Großglockner, Großglockner-Gletscherbahn
 Hallstatt, Salzbergbahn
 Innsbruck
 Hungerburgbahn (opened 1907, replaced 2005)
 Berg Isel Skisprung-Stadion (opened 2002)
 Axams Hoadlbahn (opened 1975)
 Kaprun:
 Gletscherbahn Kaprun 2 (1974–2000; site of the Kaprun disaster)
 Lärchwandschrägaufzug (opened 1952)
 Gletschershuttle (opened 1990)

 Kolbnitz, Reißeck:
  (opened 1974)
 Reißeckbahn closed for public transport
 Kufstein, Festungsbahn
 Sankt Leonhard im Pitztal,  (opened 1983)
 Salzburg:
 Reisszug (opened c. 1500)
 Festungsbahn (opened 1892)
 Zauchensee, Weltcupexpress (opened 2000)
 Seefeld in Tirol, Rosshütte (opened 1969)
 Serfaus, U-Bahn Serfaus (opened 1985)
 Spital am Pyhrn, Wurzeralmbahn
 Innerfragant, Mölltaler Gletscherbahn
 St. Anton am Arlberg, Kandaharbahn (opened 1972, replaced by monocable gondola Nassereinbahn in 2000)
 St. Johann in Tirol, Harschbichlbahn I & II (closed 1987)

Belgium
 Spa,

Bosnia and Herzegovina
 Ciglane, Sarajevo, Kosi lift

Bulgaria
 Veliko Tarnovo, Trapezitsa fortress (opened 2014)
 Belchin, Tsari Mali Grad fortress (opened 2013)

Croatia
 Zagreb, Zagreb Funicular

Czech Republic

 Prague:
 Petřín funicular (since 1891)
  (1891–1916, officially abolished in 1922, in 1926–1935 served as the first Prague escalator)
  (since 1996)
 Karlovy Vary:
  (opened 1912)
  (subway; opened 1907)
  (1912–1959)
  (Dreikreuzberg, unfinished, the construction process began 1913 and was interrupted 1914 with World War I, now the intention is actual again)

Finland
 Turku,  (2019)

France

 Arcachon, Arcachon Funicular (1913-1948) replaced in 1949 by a vertical elevator
 Les Arcs,  (opened 1989)
 Aven Armand, Aven Arman Funicular (opened 1963) tunnel funicular to provide access to the limestone cave
 Bagnères-de-Luchon, La Chaumière Funicular (1894-1970) 
 Barèges,  (1937–2000)
 Besançon,  (1912-1987)
 La Bourboule,  (1902-1958)
 Cannes,  (1928-1965)
 Les Deux Alpes,  (opened 1989)
 Évian-les-Bains,  (1913-1969; re-opened 2002)
 Grasse, Grasse Funicular (1909-1938)
 Grottes des Demoiselles, Grottes des Demoiselles Funicular  (opened 1931) tunnel funicular to provide access to the limestone cave
 Le Havre, Funiculaire du Havre (1890-1944; reopened 1950)
 Langres, 
 Laon, Poma 2000 (1989-2016) rubber tyres automated guideway transit cable-driven people mover funicular
 Lourdes, Funiculaire du Pic du Jer (opened 1900)
 Lyon:
  (1891-1972) converted into Lyon Metro Line C from 1974
  (1862-1967) mainly in tunnel, converted into a road tunnel from 1968
  (opened 1878) from 1901 until 1958 converted into a rack railway, converted back to a funicular in 1958
  (opened 1900)
  (1900-1937)
 Marseille,  (1892-1967)
 Menton, l'Annonciade Funicular (1914-closed c.1939)
 Meudon, Bellevue funicular (1893-1917, re-opened 1922, closed 1934)
 Mont-Dore,  (opened 1898)
 Nancy,  (1905-1914)
 Nice:
 Cimiez Funicular (1906-closed c.1955)
 Expo Internationale 1884 Funicular (1883-1884) 1884 Nice world's fair funicular
   (1987-1991)  amusement park funicular
 Paris, Montmartre Funicular (1900-1931; 1935–1990) converted into an inclined elevator from 1991
 Pau, Funiculaire de Pau (1908-1970; re-opened 1978)
 Penly Nuclear Power Plant, Penly Funicular (opened 1991) private funicular to transport workers and professional visitors from car parc to power plant
 Rouen, Bonsecour Funicular (1892-1915)
 Saint-Hilaire du Touvet, Funiculaire de Saint-Hilaire du Touvet (opened 1924)
 Thonon-les-Bains, Funiculaire de Thonon-les-Bains (opened 1888)
 Tignes, Funiculaire du Perce-Neige (opened 1993)
 Le Tréport,  (1908-1941) replaced by a gondola lift from 1958 until 1982 and by an inclided elevator from 2006
 Val-d'Isère, Funival (opened 1988)

Germany

 Andernach,  (1895–1941)
 Augustusburg, Augustusburg Cable Railway
 Bad Ems:
 Kurwaldbahn
  (1887–1979)
 Bad Pyrmont,  (1895–1923)
 Bad Wildbad, Sommerbergbahn
 Baden-Baden, Merkurbergbahn
 Dresden:
 Schwebebahn Dresden
 Standseilbahn Dresden
 Freiburg im Breisgau, Schlossbergbahn
 Heidelberg, Heidelberger Bergbahn
 Hirschau, Monte Kaolino
 Hohenwarte, Standseilbahn Hohenwarte
 Karlsruhe, Turmbergbahn
 Koblenz,  (1928–1959)
 Künzelsau, 
 Oberstdorf, Schattbergsprungstadion
 Oberweißbach, Oberweißbacher Bergbahn

 Peterskopf, 
 Saarbrücken,  (c. 1870–1926)
 Sellin, Sellin Pier Lift
 Straßberg,  (1912–1921; military funicular)
 Stuttgart, Standseilbahn Stuttgart
 Bad Herrenalb, 
 Wiesbaden, Nerobergbahn
 Willingen, Mühlenkopfschanze Funicular

Greece
 Athens, Lycabettus, Lycabettus Funicular
 Ermones, Corfu, Grand Mediterraneo Beach Resort Funicular
 Attika, Mt Parnes, Mt Parnes Funicular

Hungary

 Budapest, Castle Hill Funicular (1870, in 1944 destroyed, 1986 rebuilt)

Italy

 Arenzano, 
 Bergamo:
 Bergamo Upper City funicular
 Bergamo – San Vigilio funicular
 Biella, Biella funicular
 Como, Como–Brunate funicular
 Campodolcino, 
 Capri, Capri funicular
 Catanzaro, Catanzaro funicular
 Certaldo, Certaldo funicular
 Genoa:
 Quezzi funicular
 Sant'Anna funicular
 Zecca–Righi funicular
 Kaltern/Caldaro, Mendel funicular
 Livorno, Montenero funicular
 Mondovì, Mondovì funicular
 Montecatini Terme, 
 Mercogliano, Montevergine funicular
 Naples:
 Central funicular
 Chiaia funicular
 Mergellina funicular
 Montesanto funicular
 Orvieto, Stazione FS–Piazza Cahen funicular
 San Pellegrino Terme,  (1909–1988)
 Santa Cristina Gherdëina, Gardena Ronda Express
 Sorrento funicular (1893–1898)
 Trieste, Trieste–Opicina tramway
 Urtijëi,  (opened 2010)
 Varese:
 
 
 Vellone–Sacro Monte funicular
 Verona, Verona funicular

Lithuania

 Kaunas:
 Žaliakalnis Funicular Railway (built in 1931)
 Aleksotas Funicular Railway (officially opened on 6 December 1935)
 Vilnius, Gediminas Hill Funicular Railway (opened in 2003)

Luxembourg
 Luxembourg City, Pfaffenthal-Kirchberg funicular

Malta
 St. Julian's, Hotel Valentina Funicular

Norway
 Bergen, Fløibanen
 Rjukan, Gaustatoppen
 Tyssedal, Mågelibanen

Poland
 Krynica,  (opened 1937)
 Zakopane, Gubałówka Hill funicular (opened 1938)
 Międzybrodzie Żywieckie,  (opened 2003)
 Gdynia,  (opened 2015)

Portugal

 Braga, Bom Jesus Funicular,
 Lisbon:
 Bica Funicular,
 Glória Funicular
 Lavra Funicular
 Porto, Guindais Funicular
 Nazaré, Nazaré Funicular
 Viana do Castelo, 
 Viseu, 

Russia
(Russia is a transcontinental country spanning Europe and Asia. All the funicular railways below are on the European side so are listed here.)

 Nizhny Novgorod
 (1896-1926; to be totally rebuilt and re-opened in 2023)
 (1896-1927)
 Sochi
 (private) (1952-2010)
 (private)  (1934-2002; re-opened 2015)
 Svetlogorsk, Svetlogorsk Funicular (1908-closed 1960s) replaced by a cable car from 1983

Romania

Slovakia
 Starý Smokovec, Starý Smokovec–Hrebienok funicular

Slovenia
 Ljubljana, Ljubljana Castle funicular (This is an inclined elevators, not a funicular)

Spain

 :
 Bulnes funicular
 :
 Montjuïc funicular
 Tibidabo funicular
 Vallvidrera funicular
 :
 Artxanda funicular
 Larreineta funicular
  Gelida, Gelida funicular
  San Lorenzo de El Escorial, 
 Montserrat:
 Sant Joan funicular
 Santa Cova funicular
 San Sebastián, Igueldo funicular
 ,

Sweden
 Stockholm, Skansens Bergbana
 Åre, Jämtland County, Åre Bergbana
 Skärholmen, Skärholmens bergbana
 Nacka Strand, Nacka Strand bergbana
 Liljeholmen, 
 Falun,

Switzerland

(See also article List of funiculars in Switzerland, which tabulates Swiss funiculars in a sortable form.)

Berne
 Bern:
 Gurtenbahn
 Marzilibahn
 Beatenberg, Thunersee–Beatenberg Funicular
 Biel/Bienne:
 Biel/Bienne–Leubringen/Evilard funicular
 Biel/Bienne–Magglingen/Macolin funicular
 Brienz, Giessbachbahn
 Handegg, Gelmerbahn
 Interlaken:
 Harderbahn
 Heimwehfluhbahn
 Lauterbrunnen, Seilbahn Lauterbrunnen–Grütschalp (1891–2006; now a aerial cable car)
 Ligerz, 
 Mürren, Allmendhubelbahn
 Meiringen, Reichenbachfall-Bahn
 Reichenbach, Niesenbahn
 St-Imier, Funiculaire Saint-Imier – Mont-Soleil

Fribourg
 Fribourg, Funiculaire Neuveville – Saint-Pierre à Fribourg
 Moléson, Funiculaire Moléson-sur-Gruyères – Plan-Francey

Geneva 
 Funiculaire du Salève (1892–1937; not a funicular and in France: see Chemin de fer du Salève)

Glarus
 Linthal, Braunwaldbahn

Graubünden
 Davos:
 Parsennbahn
 Schatzalp-Bahn
 Flims, Caumasee-Lift
 Samedan, Muottas-Muragl-Bahn
 St. Moritz, Standseilbahn St. Moritz–Corviglia (2 sections)

Lucerne
 Kriens, Sonnenbergbahn
 Luzern:
 Dietschibergbahn (1912–1978)
 Drahtseilbahn Gütsch (Grütschlift)
 Bürgenstock, Bürgenstock-Bahn

Neuchâtel
 Neuchâtel:
 Fun'ambule (Gare–Université)
 Funiculaire Ecluse–Plan
 Funiculaire de Chaumont (La Coudre–Chaumont)

Nidwalden
 Stans,  (3 sections in 1897, 2 converted to an aerial cableway in 1973)
 Stansstad,

Obwalden
 Engelberg, Gerschnialpbahn

Schwyz
 Schwyz:
  (1933–2017)
 Stoosbahn (opened 2017)

St. Gallen
 Bergbahn Rheineck–Walzenhausen (1896–1958; now a rack railway)
 Bad Ragaz, Wartensteinbahn (1891–1964)
 St. Gallen, 
 Unterwasser, Iltiosbahn

Ticino
 Locarno, Locarno–Madonna del Sasso funicular
 Lugano:
 Lugano Città–Stazione funicular
 Lugano degli Angioli funicular (1913–1986)
 Monte Brè funicular
 Monte San Salvatore funicular
 Piotta, Ritom funicular

Uri
 Treib, Treib–Seelisberg–Bahn

Valais
 Le Châtelard, 
  (funiculaire de Barberine) 
 
 Saas-Fee, Metro Alpin (highest in the world)
 St-Luc, Funiculaire St-Luc – Tignousa
 Sierre, Funiculaire Sierre–Montana–Crans (Sierre – Montana-Vermala)
 Zermatt, Standseilbahn Zermatt–Sunnegga

Vaud
 Cossonay, Funiculaire de Cossonay (Cossonay-Gare – Cossonay-Ville)
 Les Avants, Les Avants–Sonloup funicular
 Lausanne: 
 Funiculaire Lausanne–Ouchy (1877–1958; later a rack railway, see Métro Lausanne–Ouchy #History)
 Funiculaire Lausanne Flon–Gare (1879–1959; later a rack railway)
 Funiculaire Lausanne-Signal (1899–1948)
 Montreux:
 Territet–Glion funicular
 Funiculaire Territet–Mont Fleuri (1910–1992)
 Vevey, Vevey–Chardonne–Mont Pèlerin funicular

Zug
 Schönegg, Zugerbergbahn

Zürich
 Kloten:
Skymetro
Parkbahn (Standseilbahn Butzenbüel)
 Zürich:
 Dolderbahn (1895–1971; now a rack railway)
 Polybahn (Zürichbergbahn)
 Seilbahn Rigiblick (Seilbahn Rigiviertel)

Turkey
(Turkey straddles the border between Europe and Asia, which passes along the Bosphorus Strait. All the funicular railways below are on the European side of the Bosphorus Strait so are listed here.)

 Istanbul, Tünel
 Istanbul, Kabataş-Taksim Funicular
 Istanbul, Vadistanbul–Seyrantepe Funicular
 Istanbul, Boğaziçi Üniversitesi/Hisarüstü–Aşiyan Funicular

Ukraine

 Kyiv, Kyiv Funicular
 Odesa, Odesa Funicular

United Kingdom

England
 Bournemouth:
 East Cliff Lift (1908–2016)
 Fisherman's Walk Cliff Lift (opened 1935)
 Westcliff Lift (opened 1908)
 Bridgnorth, Cliff Railway (opened 1892)
 Brighton, Devil's Dyke, Devil's Dyke Steep Grade Railway (1897–1909)
 Bristol, Clifton Rocks Railway (1893–1934) – all in tunnel
 Broadstairs, Broadstairs Cliff Railway (1901–1991) – inclined elevator, all in tunnel 
 Folkestone, Leas Lift (1885–2017; second pair 1890–1966) – water balanced
 Hastings:
 East Hill Lift (opened 1903)
 West Hill Lift (opened 1891)
 Lizard, The Lizard Lifeboat Station (RNLI)
 Lynton and Lynmouth, Lynton and Lynmouth Cliff Railway (opened 1890) – water balanced
 London, London Millennium Funicular (2003-2021) – inclined elevator
 Manchester, URBIS Museum
 Margate, Margate Cliff Railway (Cliftonville Lido) (1913–1970s) – inclined elevator, parallel to cliff 
 Padstow, Padstow Cliff Railway (RNLI)
 St Michael's Mount, St. Michael's Mount Tramway (private underground goods funicular)
 Saltburn-by-the-Sea, Saltburn Cliff Tramway (opened 1884) – water balanced
 Scarborough (See also article Scarborough funiculars):
 Central Tramway Company, Scarborough (opened 1881)
 North Cliff Lift (1930–1996)
 Queens Parade Cliff Lift (1878–1887)
 St Nicholas Cliff Lift (1929–2006)
 Spa Cliff Lift (opened 1873)
 Sennen Cove (private funicular)
 Shipley, Shipley Glen Cable Tramway
 Southend-on-Sea, Cliff Lift (opened 1912) – inclined elevator 
 Torquay, Babbacombe Cliff Railway (opened 1926)
 Wakefield, National Coal Mining Museum
 Windsor, Legoland, Legoland Hill Train (formerly Windsor Safari Park Funicular)
 York, National Railway Museum, Museum Inclinator (removed 2013)

Scotland
 Aviemore, Cairngorm Mountain Railway (2001–2018, 2023–)

Wales
 Aberporth, Clausen Rolling Platform
 Aberystwyth, Cliff Railway / Rheilffordd y Graig (opened 1896)
 Blaenau Ffestiniog, Llechwedd Slate Caverns
 Ebbw Vale
 Ebbw Vale Garden Festival Funicular (1992–1992)
 Ebbw Vale Cableway (opened 2015, 75 foot rise)
 Llandudno, Great Orme Tramway / Tramffordd y Gogarth (opened 1902)
 Machynlleth, Centre for Alternative Technology, CAT Funicular – water balanced
 Swansea, Constitution Hill Incline Tramway (1898–1902)

Isle of Man
 Douglas:
 Douglas Head Incline Railway (1900–1954)
 First Falcon Cliff Lift (1887–1896)
 Laxey, Laxey Browside Tramway (1890–1906 or 1914)
 Port Soderick, Port Soderick Beach Funicular (1897–1939)

Oceania

Australia
 Katoomba, Katoomba Scenic Railway

New Zealand
 Wellington, Wellington Cable Car
 Broken River Ski Area, Craigieburn Valley

See also 
 List of inclined elevators
 List of cable car systems
 Kaprun disaster

References

External links
 Funicular railways of the UK – comprehensive site with specifications, history, and many pictures
 A selection of UK cliff railways and cliff lifts at The Heritage Trail

Funiculars